Vechta is a railway station located in Vechta, Germany. The station opened on 1 October 1885  and is located on the Delmenhorst–Hesepe railway. The train services are operated by NordWestBahn.

Between Vechta and Lutten railway station, the trains stop at Stoppelmarkt during the market.

Train services
The station is served by the following services:

Local services  Osnabrück - Bramsche - Vechta - Delmenhorst - Bremen

References

Railway stations in Germany opened in 1885
Railway stations in Lower Saxony